Baker Bay is a bay located just inside the mouth of the Columbia River, behind Cape Disappointment on the north side of the river, in Pacific County, Washington and Clatsop County, Oregon.

Located on Baker Bay is the city of Ilwaco and the census-designated place (CDP) Chinook. The Wallacut River and Chinook River empty into the bay.

Jenny and Chatham left together, crossing the Columbia Bar together.

References

Bays of Oregon
Bays of Washington (state)
Bodies of water of Clatsop County, Oregon
Bodies of water of Pacific County, Washington
Estuaries of Washington (state)
River bays